Wilshire/Fairfax is an under-construction, underground rapid transit (known locally as a subway) station on the D Line of the Los Angeles Metro Rail system in LA's Miracle Mile area along Wilshire Boulevard. It is slated to open in 2024. It will be served by the D Line (formerly Purple) and will be the second station west of Wilshire/Western station.

Station layout
This is one of two possible transfer stations with the Crenshaw Northern Extension Rail Project line to the Hollywood district under study, the other being Wilshire/La Brea station.

Attractions
Adjacent to the new station is Hancock Park, a LA City park. Various museums surround the park, including The Los Angeles County Museum of Art (LACMA), the George C. Page Museum, the Academy Museum of Motion Pictures and the La Brea Tar Pits pavilions. Among others on Wilshire Boulevard, they make up "Museum Row" on the Miracle Mile. The Petersen Automotive Museum, Craft and Folk Art Museum are within walking distance. Television City, Farmers Market and Grove Shopping district are half a mile north on Fairfax from this station.

References

External links
Transit Agency Information

Future Los Angeles Metro Rail stations
Railway stations scheduled to open in 2024
D Line (Los Angeles Metro)
Wilshire, Los Angeles
Wilshire Boulevard